The 1978 NCAA Division I-AA football rankings are from the Associated Press. This is for the 1978 season.

Legend

Associated Press Poll

Notes

References

Rankings
NCAA Division I FCS football rankings